Martin Andreas Udbye (June 18, 1820 – January 10, 1889) was a Norwegian composer and organist.

Biography
Martin Andreas Udbye was born in  Trondheim, Norway to Ole Jonsen Tollrorskar Udbye (1785-1856) and Birgitte Øien (1781-1866).  Udbye was employed as a teacher at Domsognets primary school in Trondheim, where he worked from 1838 until 1844, when he became the organist at Church Hospital (Hospitalskirken) in Trondheim.  In 1851, Udbye took a trip to Leipzig, where he concentrated on organ and composition. The following year he was back in his hometown, where he was hired as a music teacher at Trondheim Cathedral School.

Largely self-taught, he produced an impressive output of diverse and complex works, including the first Norwegian opera, Fredkulla. Part of Norway's first opera was promoted locally in Trondheim during 1858 and met with enthusiasm.

Udbye's first attempt to present Fredkulla to a Norwegian national audience was thwarted in 1877 when the Christiania Theatre, where it was scheduled to be performed, closed due to fire.  The opera was forgotten until NRK reconstructed material and produced a concert version on the radio to commemorate its centennial in 1958. The opera was performed as part of the celebration of the 1,000 year anniversary of the founding of Trondheim during 1997.

His other stage works include three operettas: Hr. Perrichons reise (1861), Hjemve (1864), and Junkeren og flubergrosen (1867). He also composed several choruses, three string quartets (1851–5), an orchestral sketch entitled Lumpasivagabundus (1861), a fantasy on Scandinavian melodies for violin and orchestra (1866), 20 piano trios, and 100 organ preludes among other works.

References

Other sources
Kari Michelsen. The New Grove Dictionary of Opera, edited by Stanley Sadie (1992).  and

External links
 
 

1820 births
1889 deaths
Norwegian classical composers
Norwegian classical organists
Male classical organists
Norwegian opera composers
Musicians from Trondheim
19th-century classical composers
Norwegian male classical composers
19th-century Norwegian composers
19th-century male musicians
19th-century organists